José María of Manila ( : 5 September 1880 – 17 August 1936) was a Filipino-born Spanish Catholic priest and friar of the Order of Friars Minor Capuchin. He was martyred in the early phase of the Spanish Civil War, and is the third Filipino to have been declared blessed by the Roman Catholic Church.

Biography
José María was born in Manila, Philippines on 5 September 1880 to Spanish parents Don Eugenio del Saz-Orozco de la Oz, the last Spanish Mayor of Manila, and Doña Felisa Mortera y Camacho. He spent his initial years of education at Ateneo de Manila University, Colegio de San Juan de Letran, and University of Santo Tomas.

He stayed in the Philippines until he was 16 years old, pursuing further studies in Spain. Despite objections from his parents, according to López, José María fulfilled his desire to become a Capuchin priest. Records also showed that he had his simple profession in Lecaroz in Navarra on 4 October 1905, while his solemn profession was held 18 October 1908. He was ordained a priest on 30 November 1910.

José María "remained a Filipino at heart" throughout his years in Spain, desiring to return to the Philippines to serve the local Philippine Church despite the fall of the Spanish East Indies government in 1898 due to the Philippine Revolution and the Spanish–American War. Circumstances prevented him from returning, and so he resolved to zealously proclaim the Gospel in Spain, which was still suffering from poverty brought about by World War I.

There was a growing tide of anti-Catholicism and anti-clericalism in Spain, as critics accused the Church of conspiring with the government to keep the people poor. The effects of the Wall Street Crash of 1929 and later the Great Depression that pushed the working class to their limits, and military generals took advantage of the situation by staging an uprising in July 1936 that began the Spanish Civil War. Church property was seized or destroyed, and priests and religious were imprisoned. On 17 August 1936, José María was executed at the gardens of the Cuartel de la Montaña, a military building in Madrid.

Beatification

On 27 March 2013, Pope Francis approved the findings of the Congregation for the Causes of Saints that José María and 521 other companions were indeed killed because of their Roman Catholic faith, clearing the way for their beatification. These twentieth-century martyrs of the religious persecution during the Spanish Civil War were beatified on 13 October 2013 in Tarragona, Spain. The Beatification Rite and Mass was presided by the cardinal Angelo Amato, prefect of the Congregation for the Causes of Saints, who read the Apostolic Letter declaring the martyrs "Blessed" and setting their common feast day every 6 November, together with other previously beatified martyrs of the Spanish Civil War.

Martyr Companions
The Martyr Companions of Blessed José María de Manila who were also Franciscan Capuchins and were martyred during the Spanish Civil War include:

Miguel Francisco Gonzalez-Diez (Andres of Palazuelo) (1883 - 1936)
Fernando Olmeda Reguera (Fernando of Santiago) (1873 - 1936)
Geronimo Limon Marquez (Luis of Valencia) (1885 - 1936)
Jose Gonzalez Ramos Campos (Angel of Canete La Real) (1879 - 1936)
Andres Soto Carrera (Gil of Puerto de Santa Maria) (1883 - 1936)
Jose Maria Recalde Maguregui (Ignacio of Galdacano) (1912 - 1936)
Alejandro Casare Menendez (Jose of Chauchina) (1897 - 1936)
Juan Silverio Perez Ruano (Crispin of Cuevas de San Marcos) (1875 - 1936)
Rafael Severiano Rodriguez Navarro (Pacifico of Ronda) (1882 - 1936)
Joaquin Frade Eiras (Berardo of Visantona) (1878 - 1936)
Segundo Perez Arias (Ildefonso of Armellada) (1874 - 1936)
Angel de la Red Perez (Arcangel of Valdavida) (1882 - 1936)
Basilio Gonzalez Herrero (Alejo of Terradillos) (1874 - 1936)
Ezequiel Prieto Otero (Eusebio of Saludes) (1885 - 1936)
Juan Francisco Barahona Martin (Alejandro of Sobradillo) (1902 - 1936)
Facundo Escanciano Tejerina (Aurelio of Ocejo) (1881 - 1936)
Lorenzo Ilarregui Goni (Gabriel of Arostegui) (1880 - 1936)
Quirino Diez del Blanco (Gregorio of La Mata) (1889 - 1936)
Emilio Serrano Lizarralde (Saturnino of Bilbao) (1910 - 1936)
Bernardo Cembranos Nistal (Eustaquio of Villaquite) (1903 - 1936)
Felipe Llamas Barrero (Domitilo of Ayoo) (1907 - 1936)
Norberto Cembranos de la Verdura (1891 - 1936)
Andres Francisco Simon Gomez (Eloy of Orihuela) (1876 - 1936)
Jose Perez Gonzalez (Ramiro of Sobradillo) (1907 - 1936)
Ramon Juan Costa (Honorio of Orihuela) (1888 - 1936)
Ignacio Caselles Garcia (Juan Crisostomo of Gata de Gorgos) (1874 - 1936)
Alejo Pan Lopez (Ambrosio of Santibanez) (1888 - 1936)
Aproniano de Felipe Gonzalez (Miguel of Grajal) (1898 - 1936)
Jacinto Gutierrez Terciado (Diego of Guadilla) (1909 - 1936)
Pablo Merillas Fernandez (Carlos of Alcubilla de Nogales) (1902 - 1937)
Lucinio Fontanil Medina (Primitivo of Villamizar) (1884 - 1937)

See also
 Martyrs of the Spanish Civil War

References

External links
Martyrs of the Religious Persecution During the Spanish Civil War at Hagiography Circle

1880 births
1936 deaths
Capuchins
20th-century Filipino Roman Catholic priests
Martyrs of the Spanish Civil War
Filipino beatified people
People from Intramuros
Filipino people executed abroad
Filipino people of Spanish descent
University of Santo Tomas alumni